Clue: Master Detective is a 1989 video game published under the Leisure Genius label of Virgin Mastertronic. It is an adaptation of the board game of the same name.

Gameplay

Reception
M. Evan Brooks reviewed the computer editions of Risk, Monopoly, Scrabble, and Clue for Computer Gaming World, and stated that "In this reviewer's opinion, Scrabble is the weakest product (given cumbersome play and graphics), while Risk and Clue: Master Detective are the strongest."

Run found the need to look at the screen without other players seeing it to be awkward, but complimented the sound, graphics, and strategic elements. The magazine concluded, "It is a very satisfying way to play Sherlock Holmes on your very own C-64."

Reviews
Computer and Video Games - May, 1991
Commodore Format - Apr, 1991
ASM (Aktueller Software Markt) - Jan, 1990

References

External links
Review in Info

1989 video games
Amiga games
Apple II games
Atari ST games
Cluedo
Commodore 64 games
Detective video games
DOS games
Leisure Genius games
Mystery video games
Strategy video games
Video games about crime
Video games based on board games
Video games developed in the United Kingdom